Julian Emilianov Vergov (born 15 July 1970) is a Bulgarian actor. He is best known for starring in the drama series Glass Home (2010–2012), and the medical drama Stolen Life (2017–2019).

Vergov made his acting debut in theatre, starring in Lilia Abadjieva's Romeo and Juliet at the Ivan Vazov National Theatre. He later began acting in films and has  starred in numerous Bulgarian films, such as Seamstresses (2007), Mission London (2010), Directions (2017) and In the Heart of the Machine (2022), as well as appeared in several Hollywood productions, such as In Hell (2003), Until Death (2007), The Fourth Kind (2014), and Boyka: Undisputed (2017).

Education
Prior to acting, Vergov took four years of engineering studies. In 2001, he graduated from the Lyuben Groys Theatre College in Sofia, where he studied acting in the class of Professor Tzvetana Maneva.

Career
Vergov made his debut on the stage of the Ivan Vazov National Theatre in William Shakespeare's Romeo and Juliet, staged by Lilia Abadjieva. His other theatre performances include The Seagull and Hamlet at the Tear and Laughter Drama Theatre, The Marriage of Figaro at the Small City Theatre Behind the Canal, Platonov at the National Palace of Culture, The Verdict and Crime and Punishment at the Sfumato Theatre and The Goat, or Who Is Sylvia? at the Ivan Vazov National Theatre.

Apart from theatre, Vergov has starred in various television productions, such as the bTV sitcom She and He (2002–2008). In 2010, he starred in the drama series Glass House where he portrayed Nikolai. In 2012, he appeared as Mr. Savov in Revolution Z: Sex, Lies and Music, and between 2017 and 2019, he starred in Nova's medical drama series Stolen Life. In 2019 and 2020, he was a guest panelist on The Masked Singer. In 2020 and 2021, he was a judge on the Bulgarian adaptation of Your Face Sounds Familiar.

Personal life
Vergov is in a long-term relationship with his partner Irina Yalamova. They have a daughter named Alena.

Awards
In 2015, Vergov won an Icarus award for Best Supporting Actor for the role of Boris Sarafov in the Ivan Vazov National Theatre play The Thessaloniki Conspirators. In 2021, he won the Best Actor award at the Riviera International Film Festival for his role in the Bulgarian drama film German Lessons (2020).

Selected filmography

Film

Television

Notes

References

External links
 

Living people
1970 births
21st-century Bulgarian male actors
Bulgarian male film actors
Bulgarian male stage actors
Male actors from Sofia
Film people from Sofia